Sugar Loaf Tunnel is a disused railway tunnel on the former Hull and Barnsley Railway between Everthorpe and Little Weighton. The bore has been cleared of rubble but quarrying is threatening the eastern portal and chalk has now encroached to within twenty yards of the tunnel. The tunnel is in very poor condition although access remains at both ends.

Sugar Loaf Tunnel lies to the west of the much longer Drewton Tunnel and east of Weedley Tunnel.

References

Railway tunnels in England
Hull and Barnsley Railway
Tunnels in the East Riding of Yorkshire